Alberta Alexandrescu is a Romanian pianist.

While a student at the Conservatoire de Paris (where she graduated with the 1st prize in 1996 in the class of Heinrich Neuhaus' student Gérard Frémy), Alexandrescu was awarded the 1995 Long-Thibaud Competition's 3rd prize, second to Evelina Borbei (the 1st prize was declared void).

She is mainly active as a chamber musician with Trio Lumen.

References

Romanian classical pianists
Living people
Year of birth missing (living people)
Place of birth missing (living people)
Conservatoire de Paris alumni
Long-Thibaud-Crespin Competition prize-winners
21st-century classical pianists